Llangwyfan named after St. Cwyfan is a hamlet in the community of Aberffraw, Ynys Môn, Wales, which is 130.8 miles (210.6 km) from Cardiff and 218 miles (350.8 km) from London.

References

See also 
 List of localities in Wales by population

Villages in Anglesey